Hooq (stylised in all caps, pronounced like hook) was a Singaporean video on demand streaming service. It was a joint-venture of Singtel, Sony Pictures and Warner Bros., with presence in the Philippines, Thailand, India, Indonesia, and Singapore. Hooq filed for liquidation on 27 March 2020, and shut down on 30 April 2020. Its assets were acquired by Coupang.

History 
Hooq was a joint-venture of Singtel, Sony Pictures and Warner Bros., established on 30 January 2015, when the presence of Netflix in Asia was still limited. An online streaming video platform, Hooq would be able to capitalise on Singtel's reach and distribution to deliver Hollywood movies, television series, as well as local programming to Asian markets. Hooq also produced original content to attract subscribers, starting with a mini-series based on the multi-award-winning movie, On the Job which revolves around a hard-hitting topic in Philippine society.

The platform was progressively launched in the Philippines, Thailand, India, Indonesia, and Singapore over 2015 and 2016. The content on the platform was accessed with a monthly or yearly subscription fee.

Hooq was named Best Mobile App in the Media, Film, TV or Video category at the GSMA's Global Mobile (GLOMO) Awards 2016 in Barcelona.

Due to its fast growing, but loss-making status in Singtel's portfolio, an initial public offering was considered for value realisation in 2019. However, on 27 March 2020, Hooq filed for liquidation, citing "significant structural changes" that had occurred in the over-the-top (OTT) video market and its competitive landscape. Its global headcount of 240 staff was affected and laid off during this liquidation process. HOOQ shut down on 30 April 2020.

Ownership 
Singtel owned 65 percent of Hooq's shares, while Sony Pictures and Warner Bros. each owned 17.5 percent. The share structure remained unchanged when it raised an additional  in 2017. On 27 March 2020, when announced its plans for liquidation, it was revealed that Singtel has an indirect control of 76.5 percent of the company.

In July 2020, South Korean e-commerce company Coupang acquired Hooq's assets, which are being used as the basis of its own service Coupang Play.

References

External links 

Subscription video on demand services
2015 establishments in Singapore
Singaporean entertainment websites
Internet properties established in 2015
2020 disestablishments in Singapore
Internet properties disestablished in 2020
Defunct subscription services
Products and services discontinued in 2020
Defunct companies of Singapore
Defunct video on demand services
Sony Pictures Entertainment
Warner Bros.